Exodus is the fourth and final studio album released by Plus One. This is the first time releasing an album without their former members Jeremy Mhire and Jason Perry. This is also their first album that was not released under Atlantic Records but instead released by Inpop.

Track listing

Personnel 

Plus One
 Nate Cole – lead vocals
 Gabe Combs – keyboards, guitars, bass, backing vocals 
 Nathan Walters – keyboards, acoustic piano, backing vocals

Additional musicians
 Jeff Frankenstein – keyboards, programming 
 Dan Brigham – bass
 Wade Jaynes – bass (8)
 Jamie Davis – drums

Production 
 Plus One – producers
 Peter Furler – producer 
 Jeff Frankenstein – producer 
 Dan Rudin – engineer, mixing (6)
 Joe Costa – additional engineer 
 Tony Palacios – mixing (1, 5, 8, 9)
 F. Reid Shippen – mixing (2, 4, 7)
 J.R. McNeely – mixing (3, 10)
 Kenzie Butler – mix assistant (1, 5, 8, 9)
 Kevin Pickle – mix assistant (1, 5, 8, 9)
 Lee Bridges – mix assistant (2, 4, 7)
 Richard Dodd – mastering 
 Ben Frank Design – art direction, design, travel photography 
 Kelly Kerr – band photography 

Studios
 Recorded at Bridge Street Studios (Franklin, Tennessee).
 Mixed at Bridge Street Studios and The Sound Kitchen (Franklin, Tennessee); Sound Stage Studios and Emerald Sound Studios (Nashville, Tennessee).
 Mastered at Vital Recordings (Nashville, Tennessee).

2003 albums
Plus One (band) albums
Inpop Records albums